Priit Willbach (born July 22, 1953; until 2013 Priit Vilba) is an Estonian politician and businessman who was mayor of Tallinn for two weeks (October 31 – November 14) in 1996.  In 2001, while deputy mayor of Tallinn, Vilba was accused of allocating city contracts to his son.

References

1953 births
Living people
Mayors of Tallinn
20th-century Estonian politicians